Lion is the tenth solo album by English musician Peter Murphy. It was released on 2 June 2014 in the United Kingdom and 3 June 2014 in the United States through Nettwerk Records. The album was produced by Killing Joke bassist Youth alias Martin Glover.

A teaser trailer for the album was released on 27 March 2014. The track "Hang Up" was released as a single on 8 April 2014 and was accompanied by a music video. The remixed version track was also released as limited 7" Record Store Day single, with the b-side track "I’m On Your Side". Murphy embarked a North American tour in 2014 in support of the album.

It was his first album to chart on the US Billboard 200 since his 1992 album, Holy Smoke.

Background
The album is a product of sessions with Youth, with whom Murphy got together "just to see how it went." Murphy described the album as "a mixture of stuff, almost like operas for the dispossessed" and "romantic and very deep and emotional, quite symphonic in places."  He also further stated:

The album was recorded in a rapid manner, with songs improvised. Murphy wondered if he would be able to replicate the performances while on tour:

Track listing

 "Hang Up" – 5:44
 "I Am My Own Name" – 5:46
 "Low Tar Stars" – 4:12
 "I’m On Your Side" – 5:29
 "Compression" – 6:12
 "Holy Clown" – 4:14
 "The Rose" – 3:36
 "The Ghost of Shokan Lake" – 6:28
 "Eliza" – 3:23
 "Loctaine" – 6:25
 "Lion" – 4:41

Release history

Personnel
Peter Murphy - vocals
Eddie Banda - drums, keyboards, programming, engineering, mixing
Martin Destroyer - guitar (track 4)
Pavan Sharda - guitar (track 5)
Michael Rendall - keyboards, programming, engineering, mixing
Youth - bass guitar, guitar, keyboards, programming, production, mixing
Emilio DiZefalo - violin

References

External links
 

Peter Murphy (musician) albums
Nettwerk Records albums
Albums produced by Youth (musician)
2014 albums